Paul Chongkung Hong is Distinguished University Professor of Operations Management at the University of Toledo, United States.

He is a specialist in innovation strategy, new product development, global supply chain management, SMEs and network capabilities. As of August 2019, he has more than 300 research articles and books, with close to 5000 citations. His h-index is 40 and i10-index is 43 according to Google Scholar. As per the details available at Scopus, he has received more than 2400 citations and his h-index is 29.

Books
Knowledge Integration in Integrated Product Development, Society of Automotive Engineers, PA USA, 2000, 
Building Network Capabilities in Turbulent Competitive Environments: Business Success Stories from the BRICs, CRC Press (Taylor & Francis Company), 2014,

Awards
The Fulbright-Nehru Academic and Professional Excellence Award

References

1964 births
South Korean emigrants to the United States
Living people
American economists
Bowling Green State University alumni
Yonsei University alumni
University of Toledo faculty
Supply chain management